Ted Douglas Bates (September 22, 1936 – April 17, 2021) was an American football linebacker. He played in the  National Football League from 1959 to 1963. He played college football at Oregon State University and was drafted in the fifth round of the 1959 NFL Draft by the Chicago Cardinals. He played for the Cardinals for four seasons and played for the New York Jets his final season.

He died on April 17, 2021, in West Covina, California at age 84.

See also
 List of American Football League players

References

External links
 NFL.com player page

1936 births
2021 deaths
American football linebackers
Chicago Cardinals players
New York Jets players
Oregon State Beavers football players
St. Louis Cardinals (football) players
All-American college football players
Sportspeople from Harris County, Texas
People from Baytown, Texas
Players of American football from Texas